Craig Stanford is Professor of Biological Sciences and Anthropology at the University of Southern California. He is also a Research Associate in the herpetology section of the Los Angeles County Natural History Museum.  He is known for his field studies of the behavior, ecology and conservation biology of chimpanzees, mountain gorillas and other tropical animals, and has published more than 140 scientific papers and 17 books on animal behavior, human evolution and wildlife conservation.  He is best known for his field study of the predator–prey ecology of chimpanzees and the animals they hunt in Gombe National Park, Tanzania, and for his long term study of the behavior and ecology of chimpanzees and mountain gorillas in Bwindi Impenetrable National Park, Uganda.

He is also a herpetologist and involved in research and conservation of tortoises and turtles.  He is Chair of the IUCN SSC Tortoise and Freshwater Turtle Specialist Group, and is on the board of the Turtle Conservancy.

Background
Stanford received his BA in anthropology and zoology at Drew University, his MA in anthropology at Rutgers University, and his PhD in anthropology at the University of California, Berkeley in 1990. He taught at the University of Michigan and joined the University of Southern California in 1992. He has received numerous grants from the National Science Foundation, National Geographic Society, Wenner Gren Foundation, Leakey Foundation, among others.  He has also received several major teaching and research awards at USC.  He lectures widely in the U.S. and abroad.

Selected bibliography
  "The New Chimpanzee: a 21st Century Portrait of Our Closest Kin," 2018
  "Evolution: What Every Teenager Should Know," 2014
  "Planet Without Apes," 2012
 The Last Tortoise, 2010
 Beautiful Minds, 2008 (with Maddalena Bearzi)
 Apes of the Impenetrable Forest, 2007
 Exploring Biological Anthropology, (with John Allen and Susan Antón); 4th edition 2015.
 Biological Anthropology: The Natural History of Humankind, (with John Allen and Susan Antón); 4th edition 2015
 Upright : The Evolutionary Key to Becoming Human, 2003
 Significant Others: The Ape-Human Continuum and the Quest for Human Nature, 2001
 The Hunting Apes : Meat Eating and the Origins of Human Behavior, 1999
 Meat-Eating and Human Evolution, 2001 (with co-editor H. Bunn)
 Chimpanzee and Red Colobus : The Ecology of Predator and Prey, 1998

Articles
 Close encounters: mountain gorillas and chimpanzees share the wealth of Uganda's "impenetrable forest," perhaps offering a window onto the early history of hominids

See also
 Biological anthropology
 Primatology

External links
 Personal Website at USC
California Science Center
 PBS interview
National Geographic article

Year of birth missing (living people)
Living people
American anthropologists
American anthropology writers
American male non-fiction writers
Human evolution theorists
Anthropology educators
Primatologists
University of California, Berkeley alumni
Rutgers University alumni
Drew University alumni
University of Southern California faculty
University of Michigan faculty